Philip Ross Crowe (born April 14, 1970) is a Canadian former professional ice hockey winger who played in the National Hockey League for the Los Angeles Kings, Philadelphia Flyers, Ottawa Senators, and the Nashville Predators between 1994 and 2000.

Career
Hailing from Red Deer, Alberta, Crowe played for the Olds Grizzlys of the Alberta Junior Hockey League. Undrafted, he signed as a free agent in 1993 with the Los Angeles Kings. He later played 16 games with the Philadelphia Flyers during the 1995-96 season before spending parts of three seasons with the Ottawa Senators. Crowe was claimed from Ottawa by the new Atlanta franchise in the 1999 NHL Expansion Draft on June 25, 1999, though he would never play with the team. Atlanta traded Crowe to Nashville for future considerations a day later.

Known primarily as an enforcer, Crowe played in 94 games during his NHL career and recorded four goals and five assists for nine points, while collecting 173 penalty minutes.

Other
Since retiring from professional hockey, Crowe resides in Windsor, Colorado. He now plays in a hockey league in Northern Colorado.  Crowe is the co-owner of an oil and gas directional drilling company, Total Directional based out of Windsor.

Career statistics

Regular season and playoffs

Coaching statistics
Season  Team            Lge Type            
2003-04 Colorado Eagles CHL Assistant coach 
2006-07 Colorado Eagles CHL Assistant coach

External links
 

1970 births
Living people
Adirondack Red Wings players
Ayr Scottish Eagles players
Canadian expatriate ice hockey players in Scotland
Canadian ice hockey right wingers
Cincinnati Cyclones (IHL) players
Colorado Eagles players
Columbus Chill players
Detroit Vipers players
Fort Wayne Komets players
Hershey Bears players
Ice hockey people from Alberta
Ice Hockey Superleague players
Las Vegas Thunder players
Los Angeles Kings players
Milwaukee Admirals (IHL) players
Nashville Predators players
Olds Grizzlys players
Ottawa Senators players
People from Red Deer, Alberta
People from the Municipal District of Willow Creek No. 26
Phoenix Roadrunners (IHL) players
Philadelphia Flyers players
Red Deer Rustlers players
Toledo Storm players
Undrafted National Hockey League players
Canadian expatriate ice hockey players in the United States